Michèle Perret is a French linguist and novelist who was born in 1937 in Oran in Algeria.

Background and education
She lived in Algeria until 1955, first on a farm near to Sfissef (once known as Mercier-Lacombe), and then in Oran. Towards the end of her secondary education she settled in Paris. After qualifying as an agrégée in modern literature, she went on to a doctorate in literature and humanities.

Career
Her academic career has almost all been spent as a professor of medieval language at Paris West University Nanterre La Défense.

After a dissertation about shifters in Middle French her subsequent research has included: promoting, editing and translating of medieval tales;
Narratology, especially earlier narratology (12th to 15th centuries); the linguistics of utterance; and history of the French language.

Her literary work is mainly concerned with the colonial and postcolonial Maghreb, particularly Algeria.

Bibliography

Academic works and translations
 Introduction à l'histoire de la langue française, Paris SEDES, 1998 (4th edition, Armand Colin, Cursus, 2014, 240 p).
 Renaut de Beaujeu, Le Bel Inconnu, text and translation Michèle Perret, Paris, Champion, 2003, 340 p. 
 L'énonciation en grammaire du texte, Paris, Nathan (128), 1996
 Renaud de Beaujeu, Le Bel Inconnu, translated from Old French by Michèle Perret and Isabelle Weill, Paris, Champion, 1991, 112p.
 Le signe et la mention : adverbes embrayeurs CI, CA, LA, ILUEC en moyen français (XIV-XV° siècles),Genève, Droz, 1988, 294 p.
 Jean d'Arras, Mélusine, roman du XIV° siècle. Preface by Jacques Le Goff, translation and afterword by Michèle Perret, Stock, 1979, 334 p.

Literary works
 La légende de Mélusine, Paris, Flammarion, (Castor poche senior), 1997. (children's literature).
 Terre du vent, une enfance dans une ferme algérienne (1939-1945), Paris, L’Harmattan, 2009. (autobiographical fiction).
 D’ocre et de cendres, femmes en Algérie (1950-1962), Paris, L’Harmattan, 2012. (short stories).
 Erreurs de jeunesse, The Book, 2013 (poetry).
 La véridique histoire de la fée Mélusine, Tertium éditions, 2014 (children's literature).
 Les arbres ne nous oublient pas, Chèvre feuille étoilée, 2016 (story, testimony)

Contributions to collections
 Histoires minuscules des révolutions arabes, edited by Wassyla Tamzali, Montpellier, Chèvre feuille étoilée, 2012.
 L'enfance des Français d'Algérie avant 1962 , edited by Leïla Sebbar, Saint-Pourçain, Bleu autour, 2014.

Works about Perret
 Comme la lettre dit la vie. Mélanges offerts à Michèle Perret, edited by Dominique Lagorgette and Marielle Lignereux, special issue of LINX, novembre 2002. 
 Littérature et linguistique: diachronie / synchronie. Autour des travaux de Michèle Perret, cd-rom produced by Dominique Lagorgette and Marielle Lignereux, Université de Savoie, UFR LLSH, Chambéry, collection: Languages, 2007

References

External links
Bibliography  by L’Harmattan
National library of France/

1937 births
Living people
French women writers
Pieds-Noirs
French women academics